The Mixed relay race at the 2017 IAAF World Cross Country Championships was held at the Kampala in Uganda, on March 26, 2017. It was the first time this event was held at the World Cross Country Championships. 13 teams took part in the inaugural race. A team made by Refugee Athletes were set to compete, but they were unable to travel on time.

The exact length of the race was 7,858 m (2,023m first lap, two laps of 2,000 m and a final lap of 1,835m).

Complete results for individuals.

Results

See also
 2017 IAAF World Cross Country Championships – Junior women's race
 2017 IAAF World Cross Country Championships – Senior men's race
 2017 IAAF World Cross Country Championships – Senior women's race
 2017 IAAF World Cross Country Championships – Junior men's race

References

2017 IAAF World Cross Country Championships
Mixed relay race at the World Athletics Cross Country Championships